Coromandel East is a semi-rural suburb of Adelaide, South Australia. It lies within the City of Onkaparinga and has postcode 5157.

Coromandel East, and its neighbouring suburb, Coromandel Valley, gain their name from a ship, the Coromandel, which arrived in Holdfast Bay from London in 1837 with 156 English settlers. The ship was in turn named after the Coromandel Coast in India. After the ship reached the shore, some of its sailors deserted, intending to remain behind in South Australia, and took refuge in the hills in the Coromandel Valley region.

History

References

Suburbs of Adelaide